The Demography of Ghana describes the condition and overview of Ghana's population. This article is about the demographic features of the population of Ghana, including population density, ethnicity, education level, health of the populace, religious affiliations, and other aspects of the population.

Ghana's population is 30,832,019 (2021 census).

Languages 

Ghana is a multilingual country in which about 80 languages are spoken. English is the official language and lingua franca. Of the languages indigenous to Ghana, Akan is the most widely spoken.

Ghana has more than seventy ethnic groups, each with its own distinct language. Languages that belong to the same ethnic group are usually mutually intelligible.

Eleven languages have the status of government-sponsored languages: four Akan ethnic languages (Akuapem Twi, Asante Twi, Fante and Nzema) and two Mole-Dagbani ethnic languages (Dagaare and Dagbanli). The rest are Ewe, Dangme, Ga, Gonja, and Kasem, Hausa.

Ethnic groups
Ghana has more than seventy ethnic groups. Major ethnic groups in Ghana include the Akan at 47.5% of the population, the Mole-Dagbon at 16.6%, the Ewe at 13.9%, the Ga-Dangme at 7.4%, the Gurma at 5.7%, the Guan at 3.7%, the Grusi at 2.5%, the Kusaasi at 1.2%, and the Bikpakpaam a.k.a. Konkomba people at 3.5%. According to Victor Mochere, 0.064% of the population is White. 0.03% of the population is Indian, 0.01% of the population is Arab, 0.011% is African American, 0.017% is Tabom, and 2.4% of the population is Chinese.

Education 

Primary and junior secondary school education is tuition-free and mandatory. Since 1987, the Government of Ghana has increased its education budget by 700%. Basic education's share has grown from 45% to 60% of that total.

Students begin their six-year primary education at the age of six. They pass into a junior secondary school system for 3 years of academic training combined with technical and vocational training. Those continuing move into the three-year senior secondary school program. Entrance to one of the best Ghanaian universities is by examination following completion of senior secondary school with a pass mark.

Demographic trends

Ghana's first post independence population census in 1961 counted about 6.7 million inhabitants. Between 1965 and 1989, a constant 45 percent of Ghana total female population was of childbearing age.

The crude death rate of 18 per 1,000 population in 1965 fell to 13 per 1,000 population in 1992. Life expectancy rose from a 1992 average of 42 years for men and 45 years for women to 52 and 56 years in 2002. The fertility rate averaged two children per adult female in 2013.

Population Estimates by Sex and Age Group (01.VII.2015):

Births and deaths based on UNDESA 
In July 2022, the United Nations published its 2022 World Population Prospects, a biennially-updated database where key demographic indicators are estimated and projected worldwide down to the country level. They prepared the following estimates of demographic indicators in Ghana for every year from 1950 to 2021, as well as projections for future decades.

Fertility and births based on Demographics Health Survey
Total Fertility Rate (TFR) (Wanted Fertility Rate) and Crude Birth Rate (CBR) Demographics Health Survey:

Fertility and births (Census 2000 and 2010)
Total Fertility Rate (TFR) and Crude Birth Rate (CBR):

Births and deaths

Fertility data as of 2014 (DHS Program):

Other demographic statistics 
Demographic statistics according to the World Population Review in 2022.

One birth every 35 seconds	
One death every 2 minutes	
One net migrant every 53 minutes	
Net gain of one person every 48 seconds

The following demographics are from the independent Ghana Statistical Service and from the CIA World Factbook unless otherwise indicated.

Population
33,107,275 (2022 est.)
30,802,793 (Feb 2020 )
25,009,153 (December 2013 est.) Females- 50.5% Male- 49.5%

Religions

Christian 71.3% (Pentecostal/Charismatic 31.6%, Protestant 17.4%, Catholic 10%, other 12.3%), Muslim 19.9%, traditionalist 3.2%, 2.1% Hindu, other 1.3%, none 1.1% (2021 est.)

Age structure

0-14 years: 37.44% (male 5,524,932/female 5,460,943)
15-24 years: 18.64% (male 2,717,481/female 2,752,601)
25-54 years: 34.27% (male 4,875,985/female 5,177,959)
55-64 years: 5.21% (male 743,757/female 784,517)
65 years and over: 4.44% (male 598,387/female 703,686) (2020 est.)

0–14 years: 37.83% (male 5,344,146 /female 5,286,383)
15–24 years: 18.61% (male 2,600,390 /female 2,629,660)
25–54 years: 34.21% (male 4,663,234 /female 4,950,888)
55–64 years: 5.05% (male 690,327 /female 727,957)
65 years and over: 4.3% (male 557,155 /female 652,331) (2018 est.)

Population growth rate
2.23% (2022 est.) Country comparison to the world: 35th
2.16% (2018 est.) Country comparison to the world: 40th

Birth rate
28.55 births/1,000 population (2022 est.) Country comparison to the world: 34th
30.2 births/1,000 population (2018 est.) Country comparison to the world: 35th
16.03 births/1,000 population (2013 est.)

Death rate
6.14 deaths/1,000 population (2022 est.) Country comparison to the world: 150th
6.8 deaths/1,000 population (2018 est.) Country comparison to the world: 134th
7.53 deaths/1,000 population (2013 est.)

Total fertility rate
3.66 children born/woman (2022 est.) Country comparison to the world: 33rd
3.96 children born/woman (2018 est.) Country comparison to the world: 34th
Fertility rate declined from 3.99 (2000) to 3.28 (2010) with 2.78 in Urban region and 3.94 in rural region.

Median age
total: 21.4 years. Country comparison to the world: 184th
male: 21 years
female: 21.9 years (2020 est.)

total: 21.2 years. Country comparison to the world: 185th
male: 20.7 years 
female: 21.7 years (2018 est.)

Mother's mean age at first birth
22.3 years (2017 est.)
note: median age at first birth among women 25–29

Contraceptive prevalence rate
27.2% (2017/18)

Net migration rate
-0.16 migrant(s)/1,000 population (2022 est.) Country comparison to the world: 107th
-1.8 migrant(s)/1,000 population (2017 est.) Country comparison to the world: 154th
-1.85 migrant(s)/1,020 population (2013 est.)

Infant mortality rate
39.01 deaths/1,000 live births (2013 est.)

Dependency ratios
total dependency ratio: 73 (2015 est.)
youth dependency ratio: 67.1 (2015 est.)
elderly dependency ratio: 5.9 (2015 est.)
potential support ratio: 17.1 (2015 est.)

Urbanization
urban population: 58.6% of total population (2022)
rate of urbanization: 3.06% annual rate of change (2020–25 est.)

urban population: 56.1% of total population (2018)
rate of urbanization: 3.34% annual rate of change (2015–20 est.)

Life expectancy at birth
total population: 69.37 years. Country comparison to the world: 178th
male: 67.7 years
female: 71.09 years (2022 est.)

total population: 67.4 years (2018 est.)
male: 64.9 years (2018 est.)
female: 70 years (2018 est.)

total population: 65.46 years (2013 est.); 66 years
male: 64.48 years (2013 est.); 66 years
female: 66.48 years (2013 est.); 67 years (2013 est.)

Nationality
noun:
Ghanaian
adjective:
Ghanaian

Citizenship
Ghanaian citizens (20,000,000 million)
 Ghanaian people

Languages
Asante 16%, Ewe 14%, Fante 11.6%, Bono (Brong) 4.9%, Dagomba 4.4%, Dangme 4.2%, Dagarte (Dagaba) 3.9%, Likpakpaanl a.k.a. Konkomba language 3.5%, Akyem 3.2%, Ga 3.1%, Other 31.2%

Literacy
Definition: aged 15 and over can read and write
total population: 79%
male: 83.5%
female: 74.5% (2018)

total population: 76.6% (2015 est.)
male: 82% (2015 est.)
female: 71.4% (2015 est.)

School life expectancy (primary to tertiary education)
total: 12 years
male: 12 years
female: 12 years (2020)

total population: 71.5%
male: 78.3%
female: 65.3% (2010 census)

Major infectious diseases
degree of risk: very high (2020)
food or waterborne diseases: bacterial and protozoal diarrhea, hepatitis A, and typhoid fever
vectorborne diseases: malaria, dengue fever, and yellow fever
water contact diseases: schistosomiasis
animal contact diseases: rabies
respiratory diseases: meningococcal meningitis

note: since October 2021, there has been a yellow fever outbreak in Ghana with numerous cases, including some deaths, in the following regions: Savannah, Upper West, Bono, and Oti; the CDC recommends travelers going to Ghana should receive vaccination against yellow fever at least 10 days before travel and should take steps to prevent mosquito bites while there; those never vaccinated against yellow fever should avoid travel to Nigeria during the outbreak; there are no medications to treat or cure yellow fever

Unemployment, youth ages 15–24
total: 9.1%
male: 9.4%
female: 8.7% (2017 est.)

Demographic history

Historical population

Population distribution

Population density increased steadily from 36 per square kilometer in 1970 to 52 per square kilometer in 1984. In 1990 63 persons per square kilometer was the estimate for Ghana's overall population density. These averages did not reflect variations in population distribution. For example, while the Northern Region, one of ten administrative regions, showed a density of seventeen persons per square kilometer in 1984, in the same year Greater Accra Region recorded nine times the national average of 52 per square kilometer.

As was the case in the 1960 and 1970 figures, the greatest concentration of population in 1984 was to the south of the Kwahu Plateau. The highest concentration of habitation continued to be within the Accra-Kumasi-Takoradi triangle, largely because of the economic productivity of the region. All of Ghana's mining centres, timber-producing deciduous forests, and cocoa-growing lands lie to the south of the Kwahu Plateau. The Accra-Kumasi-Takoradi triangle is linked to the coast by rail and road systems—making this area an important magnet for investment and labor.

A large part of the Volta Basin is sparsely populated. The far north is heavily populated. The population density of the Upper East Region is well above the national average. This may be explained in part by the better soil found in some areas.

Urban–rural disparities

Localities of 5,000 persons and above have been classified as urban since 1960. The 1960 urban population totalled 1,551,174 persons, or 23.1 percent of total population. By 1970 the urban percentage had increased to 28 percent. That percentage rose to 32 in 1984 and was estimated at 33 percent for 1992.

Urban areas in Ghana have customarily been supplied with more amenities than rural locations. Consequently, Kumasi, Accra, and many settlements within the southern economic belt attracted more people than the savanna regions of the north; only Tamale in the north has been an exception. The linkage of the national electricity grid to the northern areas of the country in the late 1980s may help to stabilize the north-to-south flow of internal migration.
Ghana has a hugely rural population that is dependent on subsistence agriculture. 
Ghana has continued to be a nation of rural communities. Rural residency was estimated to be 67 percent of the population in 1992. In the 1970s, 72 percent of Ghana's population lived in rural areas. The "Rural Manifesto," which assessed the causes of rural underdevelopment, was introduced in April 1984. Development strategies were evaluated, and some were implemented to make rural residency more attractive. The Bank of Ghana established more than 120 rural banks to support rural entrepreneurs, and the rural electrification program was intensified in the late 1980s. The government presented its plans for district assemblies as a component of its strategy for rural improvement through decentralized administration.

References

External links

  Ghana Statistical Service